Community Theater, also known as the Lyric Theater, Newburg Theater, and Regional Opera Company, is a historic theatre building located at Newburg, Phelps County, Missouri.  It was built in 1919, and is a one-story, rectangular brick building.  It has a front gable roof behind a stepped parapet and segmental arched windows flanking the rounded arched central entrance. Until 1955, the building acted as a movie theater, lecture hall and stage for small plays and community events.  More recently, the building has seen a rebirth as a theater for small stage productions.

It was listed on the National Register of Historic Places in 2006.

References

Theatres on the National Register of Historic Places in Missouri
Theatres completed in 1919
Buildings and structures in Phelps County, Missouri
National Register of Historic Places in Phelps County, Missouri